Rebecca Shelagh Glen (born 22 April 1994) is a Scottish cricketer. In July 2018, she was named in Scotland's squad for the 2018 ICC Women's World Twenty20 Qualifier tournament. She made her Women's Twenty20 International (WT20I) for Scotland against Uganda in the World Twenty20 Qualifier on 7 July 2018.

In May 2019, she was named in Scotland's squad for the 2019 ICC Women's Qualifier Europe tournament in Spain. In August 2019, she was named in Scotland's squad for the 2019 ICC Women's World Twenty20 Qualifier tournament in Scotland.

References

External links
 
 

1994 births
Living people
Cricketers from Edinburgh
Scottish women cricketers
Scotland women Twenty20 International cricketers
Yorkshire women cricketers
Durham women cricketers